The greater sulphur-crested cockatoo (Cacatua galerita galerita) is the nominate subspecies of the sulphur-crested cockatoo. It is native to eastern Australia from Cape York to Tasmania, and has been introduced to places like Indonesia, and the Palau Islands.

Description 
It is significantly heavier than the closely-related Eleonora cockatoo and Triton cockatoo.

History 
The bird was first collected by explorer Captain James Cook in 1770 on a voyage to Australia.

Aviculture  
Greater sulphur-crested cockatoos are rarely seen in aviculture outside of Australia. Within Australia, captive birds are typically individuals that were rescued from the wild as chicks or fledglings and raised by humans.

References 

Cacatua